is a railway station operated by Sanriku Railway Company located in Miyako, Iwate Prefecture, Japan.

History
Yagisawa Miyakotandai Station opened between Tsugaruishi Station and Sokei Station on 23 March 2019. This coincided with the completion of a reconstructed section of the Yamada Line between Miyako Station and Kamaishi Station, which was then transferred to Sanriku Railway's Rias Line.

Adjacent stations

Surrounding area
 Iwate Prefectural University, Miyako College

References

Railway stations in Iwate Prefecture
Rias Line
Railway stations in Japan opened in 2019